The 1963 U.S. Open was the 63rd U.S. Open, held June 20–23 at The Country Club in Brookline, Massachusetts, a suburb southwest of Boston. Julius Boros won his second U.S. Open title in an 18-hole Sunday playoff with Jacky Cupit and Arnold Palmer. The U.S. Open returned to The Country Club for the first time in fifty years to celebrate the golden anniversary of Francis Ouimet's playoff victory in 1913. Boros won eleven years earlier in 1952, and won a third major at age 48 at the PGA Championship in 1968.

At 43, Boros was the second-oldest winner in U.S. Open history, and only a month younger than Ted Ray when he won the 1920 Open. For Palmer, it was the second consecutive year he lost in a playoff at the Open.

High winds made scoring conditions extremely difficult throughout the entire week, especially on Saturday during the final two rounds, when gusts approached . The winning score of 293 remains the highest in post-World War II U.S. Open history, while the 77.4 final-round scoring average set a record for the post-war era, later broken in 1972 at Pebble Beach. For the first time in U.S. Open history, no amateur made the cut.

Defending champion and Masters winner Jack Nicklaus missed the cut by a stroke; his next missed cut at the U.S. Open came 22 years later in 1985. He rebounded in the next two majors in 1963, missing the playoff at the Open Championship in England by a stroke for third place and won the PGA Championship in Dallas the following week.

This U.S. Open was played the week after Father's Day.

Course

Composite Course

Past champions in the field

Made the cut 

Source:

Missed the cut 

Source:

Round summaries

First round
Thursday, June 20, 1963

Source:

Second round
Friday, June 21, 1963

Source:

Third round
Saturday, June 22, 1963   (morning)

Source:

Final round
Saturday, June 22, 1963   (afternoon)

Cupit owned the 54-hole lead by a stroke over Palmer, Tony Lema, and Walter Burkemo, with Boros in a group three behind. Boros recorded two birdies on his final three holes to post a 72 and 293 total. Cupit still held the lead until a double-bogey on the 17th dropped him into a tie with Boros and Palmer. He then missed a  putt for birdie at the last that would have won the championship.

Source:

Playoff
Sunday, June 23, 1963

Boros took command early in the playoff and had a three-stroke lead at the turn. Palmer took himself out of contention with a triple-bogey at 11, while Cupit bogeyed the same hole. Boros cruised to the win from there, carding a 70 to Cupit's 73 and Palmer's 76.

First prize was $16,000, and each of the three playoff participants received a bonus of $1,500 from the playoff gate receipts.

Included in earnings is a playoff bonus of $1,500 each, from the playoff gate receipts.
Previously, three-way playoffs determined a third-place finisher (last in 1950); non-winners now tied for second.

Scorecard

Cumulative playoff scores, relative to par
{|class="wikitable" span = 50 style="font-size:85%;
|-
|style="background: Pink;" width=10|
|Birdie
|style="background: PaleGreen;" width=10|
|Bogey
|style="background: Green;" width=10|
|Double bogey
|style="background: Olive;" width=10|
|Triple bogey+
|}
Source:

References

External links
GolfCompendium.com – 1963 U.S. Open
USGA Championship Database
USOpen.com - 1963

U.S. Open (golf)
U.S. Open
U.S. Open (golf)
Sports in Brookline, Massachusetts
Golf in Massachusetts
Events in Norfolk County, Massachusetts
U.S. Open (golf)
Sports competitions in Massachusetts
Tourist attractions in Brookline, Massachusetts
U.S. Open (golf)